Overbrook is a city in Osage County, Kansas, United States.  As of the 2020 census, the population of the city was 1,005.

History
Overbrook was founded in 1888. It is named after Overbrook, Pennsylvania, the hometown of a railroad construction engineer.

Geography
Overbrook is located at  (38.779969, -95.557202).

Climate
The climate in this area is characterized by hot, humid summers and generally mild to cool winters.  According to the Köppen Climate Classification system, Overbrook has a humid subtropical climate, abbreviated "Cfa" on climate maps.

Demographics

Overbrook is part of the Topeka, Kansas Metropolitan Statistical Area.

2010 census
As of the census of 2010, there were 1,058 people, 411 households, and 253 families residing in the city. The racial makeup of the city was 97.0% White, 0.3% African American, 1.4% Native American, 0.1% Asian, 0.2% from other races, and 1.0% from two or more races. Hispanic or Latino of any race were 1.2% of the population.

There were 411 households, of which 32.8% had children under the age of 18 living with them, 50.4% were married couples living together, 9.0% had a female householder with no husband present, 2.2% had a male householder with no wife present, and 38.4% were non-families. 35.8% of all households were made up of individuals, and 20.7% had someone living alone who was 65 years of age or older. The average household size was 2.41 and the average family size was 3.19.

The median age in the city was 41.7 years. 27.2% of residents were under the age of 18; 4.6% were between the ages of 18 and 24; 21.6% were from 25 to 44; 23.2% were from 45 to 64; and 23.5% were 65 years of age or older. The gender makeup of the city was 47.3% male and 52.7% female.

2000 census
As of the census of 2000, there were 947 people, 367 households, and 255 families residing in the city. The racial makeup of the city was 97.15% White, 0.11% African American, 0.84% Native American, 1.06% from other races, and 0.84% from two or more races. Hispanic or Latino of any race were 1.48% of the population.

There were 367 households, out of which 29.7% had children under the age of 18 living with them, 59.4% were married couples living together, 6.8% had a female householder with no husband present, and 30.5% were non-families. 28.9% of all households were made up of individuals, and 17.2% had someone living alone who was 65 years of age or older. The average household size was 2.36 and the average family size was 2.90.

In the city, the population was spread out, with 22.5% under the age of 18, 6.7% from 18 to 24, 24.3% from 25 to 44, 22.1% from 45 to 64, and 24.5% who were 65 years of age or older. The median age was 43 years. For every 100 females, there were 79.7 males. For every 100 females age 18 and over, there were 76.9 males.

The median income for a household in the city was $37,772, and the median income for a family was $45,625. Males had a median income of $31,484 versus $25,625 for females. The per capita income for the city was $23,309. About 2.0% of families and 5.3% of the population were below the poverty line, including 4.7% of those under age 18 and 4.4% of those age 65 or over.

Education
Overbook is served by USD 434 Santa Fe Trail. USD 434 includes Carbondale, Overbrook and Scranton. The district high school is Santa Fe Trail High School.

The Santa Fe Trail Chargers won the Kansas State High School boys class 4A basketball championship in 1997 and the girls class 4A basketball championship in 1998 as well as the 3A golf championship in 2021.

Overbrook High School was closed through school unification. The Overbrook High School mascot was Overbrook Gophers.

See also
 Santa Fe Trail

References

Further reading

External links

 City of Overbrook
 Overbrook - Directory of Public Officials
 USD 434, local school district
 Overbrook city map, KDOT

Cities in Osage County, Kansas
Cities in Kansas
Topeka metropolitan area, Kansas